13 February Stadium, or officially Stade du-13-février in French, is a multi-use stadium in Ouargla, Algeria. It is currently used mostly for football matches and athletics. The stadium is the home ground of IRB Ouargla. The stadium holds 18,000 spectators.

References

External links

13 February Stadium
Buildings and structures in Ouargla Province